Copris signatus, is a species of dung beetle found in India, Sri Lanka and Laos.

Description

This oval, less convex species has an average length of about 10 to 16 mm. Body black and opaque. Antennae, and mouthparts are reddish to yellow in color. Bristles on the legs are also reddish or yellowish. Clypeus smooth, shining whereas pronotum densely punctured. Elytra strongly striate and closely punctured. Pygidium strongly, and closely punctured. In adult male, there is a pair of narrow erect processes in the front margin of clypeus. Just before the eyes, there is a median, transverse, erect T-shaped process in head. Female has bilobed clypeal margin in the middle with a slight conical projection in front of the eyes.

Adults are observed from old elephant dungs, and cow dungs.

References

Scarabaeinae
Insects of Sri Lanka
Insects of India
Beetles described in 1858